The 1980 Nations motorcycle Grand Prix was the first round of the 1980 Grand Prix motorcycle racing season. It took place on the weekend of 9–11 May 1980 at the Circuito Internazionale Santa Monica.

Classification

500 cc

References

Italian motorcycle Grand Prix
Italian
Motorcycle